

Pascale Hugues (born 1959) is a French journalist and writer based in Berlin, Germany.

Hugues was born in Strasbourg into family with French and German ancestry. From 1984 to 1988 she worked as radio moderator and as journalist for BBC World Service in the United Kingdom and from 1986 to 1989 as foreign correspondent for the French newspaper  Libération. From 1989 to 1995 she worked as foreign correspondent in Bonn and Berlin. After that she settled in Berlin, where she continued to work as a journalist for various French and German newspapers. She also published a number of nonfiction books and was the author of documentaries for the TV network Arte.

Works 
 Le bonheur allemand (1999)
 Marthe et Mathilde : L’Histoire vraie d'une incroyable amitié, 1902-2001. Les Arènes, Paris 2008
 Rue tranquille dans beau quartier
La Robe de Hannah : Berlin 1904-2014. Les Arènes, Paris 2014
 English edition: Hannah’s Dress. Berlin 1904-2014. Polity Press, Cambridge 2017, translated by C. Jon Delogu
 Deutschland à la française. Rowohlt, Reinbek 2017.
 Mädchenschule, Rowohlt, 2021

Filmography 
Bleiben oder gehen? (Staying or leaving). Arte, 2001 - documentary about the youth in East Germany after the reunification 
Alte Liebe rostet nicht (Old Love doesn't rust). Arte, 2003 - documentary about the Franco-German Friendship

Awards 
 2006: Chevalier de l’ordre national de Mérite for her contribution to the Franco-German Friendship
 2014: European Book Prize for La robe de Hannah. Berlin 1904–2014

References

External links 
 Talk with the French Journalist Pascal Hugues | Insight Germany. Deutsche Welle, 2014 - interview (video, 42:30 mins)
 Interview including a biographical note. Federal Agency for Civic Education (BPB), 2015-04-13

French journalists
Living people
1959 births
Writers from Strasbourg